Subtraction (Persian: تفریق, romanized: Tafrigh) is a 2022 Iranian noir thriller drama film co-written and directed by Mani Haghighi. The film stars Taraneh Alidoosti and Navid Mohammadzadeh. It had its world premiere at the Toronto International Film Festival on September 10, 2022.

Premise 
Farzaneh (Taraneh Alidoosti) is a young driving instructor who lives with her husband Jalal (Navid Mohammadzadeh). One day she spots her husband walking into an unknown woman’s house. When she confronts Jalal, he claims he wasn't in town on that time. Later Jalal decides to check out the house for himself. When Jalal arrives there, he meets a woman named Bita who is the spitting image of Farzaneh. Stunned, the two compare their partners photos, Bita’s husband also looks identical to Jalal.

Cast 

 Taraneh Alidoosti as Farzaneh
 Navid Mohammadzadeh as Jalal
 Soheila Razavi
 Saeed Changizian
 Ali Bagheri
 Vahid Aghapour
 Esmaeil Pourreza
 Farham Azizi
 Gilda Vishki

Production

Pre-production 
After the cast was announced on 23 May, 2020, the news agencies announced the collaboration between Navid Mohammadzadeh and Parinaz Izadyar. These two have previously appeared together in films such as Life and a Day (2016), 6.5 per Meter (2019), The Warden (2019) and Les Misérables (2018) play.

Haghighi called the reason for Izadyar's transfer because of Corona and the commitment of the actors in other projects and said: "Prinaz Izdiyar was so wonderful during our training that I am really sorry that this collaboration did not continue. On the other hand, I consider it a great blessing that Alidoosti had the opportunity to accompany us and will be by our side."

Filming 
The filming of Subtraction started in 2020, and events such as the COVID-19 pandemic and the presence of Alidoosti instead of Parinaz Izadyar, made the film not to make it to the 40th Fajr Film Festival.

Initially, the film was supposed to be made in 2020, but after Haghighi contracted the corona disease, the filming was delayed until March 2021. In April 2021, due to the peak of the Corona disease and the declaration of a red state in Tehran, the filming was stopped. Finally, in May 2021, the filming of Subtraction was finished and entered Post-production.

Release 
The film was supposed to be screened at the 40th Fajr Film Festival, but it was not able to participate in the festival because the Post-production was not completed.

The film had its world premiere in the Platform Prize program at the Toronto International Film Festival on September 10, 2022.

References

External links 
 
Iranian drama films
2020s Persian-language films
2022 drama films
2022 films